Gamal Aziz, also known as Gamal Abdelaziz, (Arabic: جمال عزيز) (born ) is an Egyptian-American businessman. Aziz is the former president of Wynn Macau Limited and chief operating officer of Wynn Resorts Development. He was also the former CEO of MGM Resorts International. In March 2019, Aziz and others were named in a criminal complaint filed by the U.S. Justice Department, and charged with conspiracy to commit mail fraud and honest services mail fraud, as part of the 2019 college admissions bribery scandal. In October 2021, he was found guilty, and in February 2022 he was sentenced to serve one year and one day in federal prison. He was also ordered to serve two years of supervised release, 400 hours of community service, and pay a fine of $250,000.

Career
Aziz was born in Egypt, grew up in Cairo, Egypt, and resides in Las Vegas, Nevada. He earned a bachelor's degree in business at the University of Cairo.

He held senior executive positions at Caesars Palace in Las Vegas, the Plaza Hotel in New York City, the Westin Hotel in Washington, D.C., and the St. Francis in San Francisco.

Aziz helped Steve Wynn open the Bellagio, the most expensive US hotel ever built, as that hotel's senior vice president, a post he held from 1998 to 2000. He oversaw the food and beverage division.

Aziz was next president and chief operating officer of the 5,000-room, 10,000-employee resort MGM Grand, the largest hotel by rooms in the US, joining it in 2001. He was then president and chief operating officer of MGM Resorts International, and then MGM Hospitality in September 2010. In that position he helped finalize 27 hotel projects in leisure markets around the world.

In January 2013 Aziz was appointed president and chief operating officer of Wynn Resorts Development LLC, overseeing expansion opportunities. He next became president of Wynn Macau, Ltd., reporting directly to Wynn. In December 2015 Ecole hôtelière de Lausanne (EHL), a hotel and hospitality school, appointed him to its international advisory board. He resigned in September 2016 as president and as a board member of Wynn Macau.

As of March 2019, Aziz was chairman and CEO of Legacy Hospitality Group since January 2017, according to his LinkedIn page.

Legal issues 
Aziz was involved in the 2019 college admissions bribery scandal. He was accused of federal charges which included donating $300,000 to a college consulting nonprofit in order to facilitate the falsification of his daughter's athletic honors as well as a false athletic profile. These actions may have contributed to his daughter's acceptance into the University of Southern California (USC) as a basketball recruit. He was arrested on March 12, 2019, on charges of conspiracy to commit mail fraud and honest services mail fraud, but was soon granted a personal recognizance release bond which required him to appear in court.

On March 29, 2019, Aziz appeared in court. His attorney Brian Kelley said they intend to fight the allegations and stated to the press "we maintain it is a weak case", and that the government's case hinges on a "deeply compromised" witness.

On September 8, 2021, Aziz's criminal trial officially began, with jury selection commencing in a Boston federal court.

On October 8, 2021, he was found guilty of fraud and bribery conspiracy. On February 9, 2022, Aziz was sentenced to serve one year and one day in federal prison. He was also ordered to serve two years of supervised release, 400 hours of community service, and pay a fine of $250,000.

References

External links
 "Gamal Aziz", Elite Traveler.
 "Executive Interview: Gamal Aziz, President and CEO of MGM Hospitality", Pursue The Passion, 13 September 2007.

1950s births
American casino industry businesspeople
American corporate directors
Cairo University alumni
Living people
People convicted of fraud
Businesspeople from Cairo
People from Las Vegas
Egyptian emigrants to the United States